Edixon Perea Valencia (born 20 April 1984) is a Colombian footballer.

Football career
Perea was born in Cali. He played 29 games in the 2005 season for Atlético Nacional before joining Bordeaux. He was one of the players who helped the Colombian youth team reach the third place in the 2003 FIFA World Youth Championship. He was on trial at the English Premier League Club Blackburn Rovers in 2010.

Club statistics

Updated to games played as of 16 December 2013.

International career
Perea is also on the Colombia national football team where he has been called upon during the qualifying campaign for the 2006 World Cup.

He played for the Colombia national team at the Copa America in 2004 and 2007.

International goals – Colombia

Notes

References

External links
 
 
 
 

1984 births
Living people
Footballers from Cali
Colombian footballers
Association football forwards
Colombia under-20 international footballers
Colombia international footballers
2004 Copa América players
2007 Copa América players
Atlético Huila footballers
Deportes Quindío footballers
Deportivo Pasto footballers
Atlético Nacional footballers
FC Girondins de Bordeaux players
Grêmio Foot-Ball Porto Alegrense players
UD Las Palmas players
Cruz Azul footballers
Changchun Yatai F.C. players
Deportivo Cali footballers
Budapest Honvéd FC players
Categoría Primera A players
Liga MX players
Ligue 1 players
Segunda División players
Campeonato Brasileiro Série A players
Chinese Super League players
Nemzeti Bajnokság I players
Colombian expatriate footballers
Expatriate footballers in France
Expatriate footballers in Spain
Expatriate footballers in Brazil
Expatriate footballers in Mexico
Expatriate footballers in China
Expatriate footballers in Hungary
Colombian expatriate sportspeople in France
Colombian expatriate sportspeople in Brazil
Colombian expatriate sportspeople in Mexico
Colombian expatriate sportspeople in China
Colombian expatriate sportspeople in Hungary